Carthage Courthouse Square Historic District may refer to:
Carthage Courthouse Square Historic District (Carthage, Illinois), listed on the NRHP in Illinois
Carthage Courthouse Square Historic District (Carthage, Missouri), listed on the NRHP in Missouri